Osman İşmen (born 2 August 1952) is a Turkish conductor, composer, pianist, keyboardist, and music arranger.

In 1973, he started his professional music career as a conductor with an orchestra group, and in 1977 he also started working as a music arranger. Togeth with his orchestra, Osman İşmen performed disco, funk and soul music for a number of years. In 1978, he published his first studio album Diskomatik Kâtibim. After publishing his second album Disco Madımak in 1979, he started collaborating with Kısa Dalga Group and together they released Disco Türkü (1980), Disco Maşallah (1981) and Disco Gencebay. These albums contained re-edited versions of songs in various musical styles. The instrumental works that were performed by Osman İşmen Orchestra in 1987 were later published under the name TRT Ara Müziği.

In 1998, he founded the music group Osman İşmen Project and started making jazz music. In this genre, he released Jazz Eastern (1998), Rakkas (2000), Jazz İstanbul (2003), Jazz Eastern II (2006) and East Inn (2006). In the years that followed, he released the albums Saharians (2009), Romantika (2009), Elektro Klasikler (2009), Saz ve Jazz Eserleri (2009), Modern Oyun Havaları (2009), Lounge with Our Golden Songs (2009), Guitar & Bouzouki Plays 10 Hot Hits (2009), Senfonik Rock Türkülerimiz, Vol. 01 (2013, with Allegra Quartet) and Tangopera (2014, with Allegra Quartet). Işmen has also worked as an arranger and composer for various other artists.

Early life 
He was born on 2 August 1952 in Istanbul, to parents who both were civil servants. At the age of 6, he started learning classic piano. He studied at Mecidiyeköy High School. In 1965, he found the orchestra group Grup Senkop. The group won the Amateur Communities Competition organized by the Diskotek in May 1968, together with the Istanbul High School. He graduated from Istanbul University Faculty of Business Administration in 1973.

Career 
Following his graduation, he started to perform live and accompanied various artists, eventually founding Ritim 93 Orchestra in the same year. In 1976, he served as conscript officer for 3.5 months in İskenderun. During his military service, İşmen met Ali Kocatepe who "brought him into the music world". In 1977, he started working as a music arranger.

Together with his orchestra group Osman İşmen Orchestra, he published his first studio album Diskomatik Kâtibim in 1978 under the label Beta Müzik. The album received a Music Oscar award from Hey magazine in the year it was published. It was followed by Disco Madımak, which was published by Yonca Plak in 1979. The instrumental songs in the second album were used in the soundtrack of a number of Turkish comedy films at the time. In 1980, he collaborated with Kısa Dalga Group, and their album, which was a mix of Turkish folk music and disco music, was published under the title Disco Türkü by Yonca Plak. In the same year, he ended his stage career and started doing studio works only. For his 1981 album, Disco Maşallah, which was published by Yaşar Kekeva Plak, Osman İşmen Orchestra and Kısa Dalga Group came together. In the same year, Kervan Plak published his other album Disco Gencebay, on which Orhan Gencebay worked as a keyboardist and Kısa Dalga Group performed the songs. In 1987, his instrumental songs with Osman İşmen Orchestra were published under the title TRT Ara Müziği by Oskar Plak.

In 1998, he founded the group Osman İşmen Project, with whom he worked on classic Turkish and jazz music, and the songs were published in the album Jazz Eastern. In 2000, Bonus Müzik published his album Rakkas. He continued working on jazz music and in 2003 Universal published the album Jazz İstanbul, which included songs that were both composed and arranged by him. In 2006, DMC released his new jazz albums Jazz Eastern II and East Inn. In 2009, Ares Müzik released Saharians. In the same year, Âti Müzik published his instrumental songs in a number of different albums: Elektro Klasikler, Modern Oyun Havaları, Romantika and Saz ve Jazz Eserleri. Two more albums, Lounge with Our Golden Songs and Guitar & Bouzouki Plays 10 Hot Hits, were later published by Şafakaraman Production. In 2013, Fono Müzik published his new album Senfonik Rock Türkülerimiz, Vol. 01, which contained new versions of his Turkish folk songs, and Allegra Quartet collaborated with him on it. He later worked with Allegra Quartet again, and their album, Tangopera, was released in 2014 by Anadolu Tur Reklam. In 2016, the song "Kale" from his album Rakkas was released by Gloss as a single. The following year, Gloss released his other single "Gypsy Song Sahara".

Discography 
Studio albums
 Diskomatik Kâtibim (1978, Beta Müzik; re-released in 2009 by Ossi Müzik)
 Disco Madımak (1979, Yonca Plak)
 Disco Türkü (1980, Yonca Plak, with Kısa Dalga Group)
 Disco Maşallah (1981, Yaşar Kekeva Plak, with Kısa Dalga Group)
 Disco Gencebay (1981, Kervan Plak, with Kısa Dalga Group)
 TRT Ara Müziği (1987, Oskar Plak)
 Jazz Eastern (1998)
 Rakkas (2000, Bonus Müzik)
 Jazz İstanbul (2003, Universal)
 Jazz Eastern II (2006, DMC)
 East Inn (2006, DMC)
 Saharians (2009, Ares Müzik)
 Romantika (2009, Âti Müzik)
 Elektro Klasikler (2009, Âti Müzik)
 Saz ve Jazz Eserleri (2009, Âti Müzik)
 Modern Oyun Havaları (2009, Âti Müzik)
 Lounge with Our Golden Songs (2009, Şafakaraman Production)
 Guitar & Bouzouki Plays 10 Hot Hits (2009, Şafakaraman Production)
 Senfonik Rock Türkülerimiz, Vol. 01 (2013, Fono Müzik, with Allegra Quartet)
 Tangopera (2014, Anadolu Tur Reklam, Allegra Quartet ile)

Singles
 "Kale" (2016, Gloss)
 "Gypsy Song Sahara" (2017, Gloss)

As featured artist
 Jazz 'n' World Vol. 1 (1999, Columbia Records)
 Buddha-Bar III (2001, George V Records)
 Kebab Connection (2005, Normal Records)
 Homegrown Istanbul - 2 (2008, Pozitif Müzik Yapım)
 Beyond Istanbul 2 - Urban Sounds of Turkey (2009, Trikont)

As arranger

References

External links 

 
 

Living people
1952 births
Turkish composers
Turkish pianists
Turkish conductors (music)
Turkish music arrangers
Turkish keyboardists
Disco musicians
Funk musicians
Soul musicians
Turkish folk musicians
21st-century conductors (music)
21st-century pianists